Martin Harrington is a British songwriter, record producer and music publisher. He has written songs for many music artists including Emma Bunton, Five, Celine Dion, Ed Sheeran, Natalie Imbruglia and Blue.

See also
Music of the United Kingdom

References

External links
IMDb entry

British record producers
British songwriters
Living people
Year of birth missing (living people)
Place of birth missing (living people)